Pigache, Poulaine and Pigage are types of shoe with a long pointed turned up toe that was worn during the Romanesque and Byzantine period. The plural form of the word is pigaciae.

The shoes were sometimes stuffed with moss, wool, or horsehair to make the extension erect. The protrusion was sometimes flesh colored. In the 12th century the shoes had a pointed and hooked toe that was sometimes adorned with a small bell.

See also
Crakow

References

Historical footwear
Byzantine clothing
Roman-era clothing